KKYZ (101.7 FM) is a radio station broadcasting an Oldies format. Licensed to Huachuca City, Arizona, United States, the station is owned by Cochise Broadcasting, LLC (a Wyoming LLC).

History
The station went on the air as KXHC on October 17, 1990. On December 21, 1990, the station changed its call sign to KKYZ.

In 2010, Cochise Broadcasting obtained a second construction permit for a station on 101.7 MHz in Huachuca City, with call sign KXKR. In December 2011, that station was activated at 100 watts, a temporary facility, as Tucker was in the middle of a lengthy process to move KKYZ into the Tucson market (to be licensed to Catalina Foothills) at 101.1 MHz. An application for such was approved in 2020; in 2021, the KKYZ call letters were transferred to the Huachuca City facility, operating on the same facility as the first KKYZ, and the station moving to Tucson changed call letters from KKYZ to KXKR and went silent.

References

External links

KYZ
Radio stations established in 1990
Oldies radio stations in the United States
1990 establishments in Arizona